Tragocephala ducalis is a species of beetle in the family Cerambycidae. It was described by White in 1856. It is known from South Africa.

Varietas
 Tragocephala ducalis var. confluentina Breuning, 1934
 Tragocephala ducalis var. chloe Thomson, 1865
 Tragocephala ducalis var. grisea Jordan, 1894
 Tragocephala ducalis var. frenata Gerstäcker, 1855
 Tragocephala ducalis var. rikatlae Peringuey, 1896

References

ducalis
Beetles described in 1856